Follow Your Heart is a 1936 American film directed by Aubrey Scotto.

Cast
Marion Talley as Marian Forrester
Michael Bartlett as Michael Williams
Nigel Bruce as Henri Forrester
Luis Alberni as Tony Masetti
Henrietta Crosman as Madame Bovard
Vivienne Osborne as Gloria Forrester
Walter Catlett as Joe Sheldon
Eunice Healey as Specialty Dancer
Ben Blue as himself
Mickey Rentschler as Tommy Forrester
John Eldredge as Harrison Beecher
Margaret Irving as Louise Masetti
Si Jenks as Mr. Hawks
Josephine Whittell as Mrs. Plunkett

Soundtrack
 "Page Song" from opera Les Huguenots (Written by Giacomo Meyerbeer)
 "Follow Your Heart" (Music by Victor Schertzinger, lyrics by Sidney D. Mitchell)
 "Magnolias in the Moonlight" (Music by Victor Schertzinger, lyrics by Walter Bullock)
 "Who Minds'Bout Me" (Music by Victor Schertzinger, lyrics by Walter Bullock)

External links

1936 films
1936 musical films
American musical films
American black-and-white films
Republic Pictures films
Films directed by Aubrey Scotto
Films produced by Nat Levine
1930s English-language films
1930s American films